Rekha Bhardwaj (born 24 January 1964) is an Indian singer and live performer. She has received two Filmfare and one National Awards. In addition to Hindi, she has also sung in Bengali, Marathi,  Punjabi and Malayalam  languages.

Personal life 
Bhardwaj was born in Delhi and is one of six siblings (5 sisters and a brother).

She married the noted film director, composer and playback singer Vishal Bhardwaj in 1991. She first met him in 1984 when preparing for the annual function of Hindu College in New Delhi.

Professional career
Bhardwaj was initially trained in music by her older sister at their home. She went on to receive formal training under Pandit Amarnath.

Bhardwaj's first album titled 'Ishqa Ishqa' was released in 2002, ten years after its conception. Its success got her recognition and helped bag her career-defining songs like "Namak Ishq Ka" in the 2006 film Omkara (composed by her Husband Vishal Bharadwaj) followed by "Sasural Genda Phool" (a Chhattisgarhi folk song recreated by AR RAHMAN) in 2009 film Delhi-6.

Awards and honours 
 2015 Nominated for Filmfare Award for Best Playback Singer (female) for the song "Humari atariya pe" from the 2014 film Dedh Ishqiya 
 2014 Nominated for Hum Award for Best Original Soundtrack for the song Kabhi Ashna Kabhi Ajnabi from the 2013 Pakistani TV serial Humnasheen
 2013 Mirchi Music Awards for Raag-based song of the year for "Ek Ghadi" from D-Day
 2012 Co-winner of Filmfare Award for Best Playback Singer (female) with Usha Uthup for the song "Darling" from the 2011 film 7 Khoon Maaf 
 2011 National Award for the song "Badi dheere jali" from the 2010 film Ishqiya
 2011 Mirchi Music Awards for Female Vocalist of The Year for "Darling" from 7 Khoon Maaf
 2010 Filmfare Award for Best Playback Singer (female) for the song "Sasural Genda Phool" from the 2009 film Delhi-6
 2009 Mirchi Music Awards for Female Vocalist of The Year for the song "Sasural Genda Phool" from Delhi-6

Filmography 
Bhardwaj has been a playback singer for various films in various languages

Hindi

Other languages

Other works
In addition to films, Bhardwaj has also sung for TV serials, etc.

See also 
 List of Indian playback singers

References

External links
 

1964 births
Living people
Bollywood playback singers
Hindi-language singers
Indian women playback singers
Hindu College, Delhi alumni
Best Female Playback Singer National Film Award winners
Filmfare Awards winners
20th-century Indian women singers
20th-century Indian singers
21st-century Indian singers
21st-century Indian women singers
Women musicians from Delhi
Singers from Delhi